Mielesznica  is a village in the administrative district of Gmina Cybinka, within Słubice County, Lubusz Voivodeship, in western Poland, close to the German border.

The village has a population of 50.

References

Mielesznica